N'Gabacoro or N'Gabacoro-Droit is a small town and rural commune in the Cercle of Kati in the Koulikoro Region of south-western Mali. The commune covers an area of 103 square kilometers and includes the town and 6 villages. In the 2009 census the commune had a population of 15,153. The town of N'Gabacoro lies 18 km east of the Malian capital, Bamako.

References

External links
.

Communes of Koulikoro Region